Ross Dickran Bagdasarian (born May 6, 1949) is an American actor, animator and producer, known for his work on the Alvin and the Chipmunks franchise.

He is the son of the franchise's creator, Ross Bagdasarian.

Early life
Bagdasarian was born in Fresno, California, the son of Armenian-American parents Armenuhi Bagdasarian (née Kulhanjian) and Ross Bagdasarian (1919–1972). As a child, he worked with his father on The Alvin Show by helping edit and coordinate the soundtracks and falsetto voice-overs of the Chipmunks.

Career
Bagdasarian graduated from law school. He succeeded his father as president of Bagdasarian Productions in 1972 after the death of the elder Bagdasarian. The company had fallen into obscurity after significant success between 1958 and the late 1960s. Bagdasarian was also admitted to the California bar as an attorney in 1975.

Under Bagdasarian's supervision, new Chipmunks records were created shortly after his marriage to Karman, including Chipmunk Punk. In 1981, the Chipmunks returned to television in the cartoon special A Chipmunk Christmas. Two years later, Ruby-Spears Productions' Alvin and the Chipmunks Saturday morning cartoon series debuted on NBC. Based on that series, a feature film, The Chipmunk Adventure was released in 1987. Bagdasarian voices Alvin, Simon, and Dave Seville, and Karman voices Theodore and the Chipettes (Brittany, Jeanette, and Eleanor).

Bagdasarian and Karman hold tight creative and financial control over the Chipmunk franchise, reviewing each and every business contract in great detail. In the mid-90s, Bagdasarian bought out his brother's and sister's portions of the Chipmunk rights, to take complete control of the franchise.

Universal Pictures lawsuit
Bagdasarian licensed the rights to the Chipmunk characters to Universal Pictures in 1996, resulting in a string of Universal-produced direct-to-video films. Four years later, he and Karman sued them for breach of contract, claiming that Universal failed to properly utilize, market, and merchandise the characters and hence resulting in a loss of royalties to Bagdasarian. The case was decided in Bagdasarian's favor. "For us, it was a custody battle", Karman said. "They finally realized 'OK, these two are really fighting for their kids'."

Personal life
Bagdasarian married Janice Karman in 1980. She is co-president of Bagdasarian Productions.

Filmography

Film

Television

References

External links
History at Chipmunks.com

Living people
Alvin and the Chipmunks
American film producers
American male voice actors
American people of Armenian descent
Animators from California
Male actors from Fresno, California
Record producers from California
20th-century American male actors
21st-century American male actors
20th-century American screenwriters
1949 births